Ballynagross is a townland of 368 acres in County Down, Northern Ireland. It is situated in the civil parish of Annaclone and the historic barony of Iveagh Upper, Upper Half.

References

Townlands of County Down
Civil parish of Annaclone